The 2006 Merdeka Tournament is the 38th editions of the Merdeka Tournament and was held on 23 to 29 August 2006. This is the first edition not played at Merdeka Stadium in Kuala Lumpur which is being refurbished. All matches played at Shah Alam Stadium in Shah Alam, Selangor.

Groups

Group stage

Single Group Stage

Knockout stage

Finals

Award

External links
 2006 Merdeka Tournament at RSSF.com website

Merdeka Cup
2006 in Malaysian football
2006–07 in Indonesian football
2006 in Burmese football
2006 in Thai football
Mer